Sheila Rock is an American photographer who was active in London since 1970. Rock is primarily known for her music photography, specifically her work during the punk and post-punk scene.

In 2017, from April 26 to July 4, the Barbican Music Library and Barbican Art Gallery hosted an exhibit of Rock's work including some of her vintage prints from the 1970s. 

Her work is included in the collection of the Museum of Fine Arts Houston and the National Portrait Gallery, London. She has published four books of her works.

She studied at Boston University, and London Film School. She was married to Mick Rock, who was also a photographer.

Publications
Sera (2003)
Horses
Punk+ (2013)
Tough & Tender (2015)
Young Punks (2020)
80s Sound and Vision (2022)

References

Living people
20th-century American photographers
21st-century American photographers
20th-century American women artists
21st-century American women artists
Date of birth unknown
Year of birth missing (living people)

Women in punk
21st-century American women photographers